Prior to its uniform adoption of proportional representation in 1999, the United Kingdom used first-past-the-post for the European elections in England, Scotland and Wales. The European Parliament constituencies used under that system were smaller than the later regional constituencies and only had one Member of the European Parliament each.

The constituency of Hereford and Worcester was one of them.

Boundaries
1979-1984: Bromsgrove and Redditch, Hereford, Kidderminster, Leominster, South Worcestershire, West Gloucestershire, Worcester.

1984-1994: Bromsgrove, Hereford, Leominster, Mid Worcestershire, South Worcestershire, West Gloucestershire, Worcester, Wyre Forest.

MEPs

Election results

References

External links
 David Boothroyd's United Kingdom Election Results 

European Parliament constituencies in England (1979–1999)
Politics of Herefordshire
Politics of Worcestershire
1979 establishments in England
1994 disestablishments in England
Constituencies established in 1979
Constituencies disestablished in 1994
Hereford and Worcester